Idrocilamide (trade names Talval, Srilane, Relaxnova, Brolitène) is a medication with skeletal muscle relaxant and anti-inflammatory actions used as a topical cream to treat lumbago and other kinds of muscular pain; it is available on prescription or over-the-counter in France and various other countries.

Interactions
Idrocilamide has been reported to be a potent inhibitor of the metabolism of caffeine.

References

Drugs acting on the musculoskeletal system
Carboxamides